Guy Code is an American reality comedy television series on MTV2. The series debuted on November 15, 2011, and features various pop culture entertainers, top comics, athletes, and specialized experts who tell the story of the special code of conduct that exists between straight men.

On September 26, 2012, MTV2 announced that series' second season delivered the highest-rated and most-watched original series in MTV2 history.

MTV launched the Guy Code Blog in July 2012, right before the series' second season began. Maintained by head editor, Ryan McKee, and associate editor, Marty Beckerman, the daily blog acts as a supplement to the series. They published humorous articles and original videos that follow Guy Code'''s topics and tone as well as cover the series and its cast members.

A spinoff series, Girl Code, debuted on MTV on April 23, 2013. It later moved to Snapchat Discover via MTV. It was announced on April 25, 2013, that two additional spin-offs were in production: The Hook-Up, a dating show that was to be hosted by Andrew Schulz from Guy Code but never made it to series; and Guy Court, a faux courtroom hearing in which personalities judged cases of "code violations". Guy Court premiered on November 6, 2013. A spinoff, Guy Code vs. Girl Code, premiered in 2016 for one season on MTV2. In 2019, Teen Code launched on Snapchat Discover via MTV. In September 2020, MTV aired a one-time special called 2020 Code about the year 2020 featuring Code alum.

On July 21, 2013, MTV and MTV2 aired an hour-long special titled Guy Code Honors that focuses on how guys love sci-fi, thrillers and fantasy action. It also includes titles from movies, shows, actors and superheroes broke or enforced the guy code. Guy Code Honors features some of the cast of Guy Code as well as celebrities such as Tyler Posey, Vin Diesel, and Rob Kazinsky.  It was filmed July 18, 2013, at Comic-Con.

It was announced on September 23, 2013, that MTV2 had greenlit a fourth season of Guy Code''. Season four premiered on April 16, 2014. Season five, the last season aired, began January 14, 2015.

Cast

 Andrew Schulz (season 1–5)
 April Rose(season 1–4)
 Ariel Meredith (season 4–5)
 Akaash Singh (season 5)
 Big Black (seasons 1–2)
 Charlamagne Tha God (season 1–5)
 Chris Distefano (season 2–5)
 Dan Soder (season 3–5)
 Fahim Anwar (season 5)
 Damien Lemon (season 1–5)
 David Ebert (season 5)
 Donnell Rawlings (season 1–5)
 Sami El Kassmi (season 5)
 Jermaine Fowler (season 3–5)
 Jordan Carlos (season 1–5)
 Kevin Barnett (season 3–5)
 Lil Duval (season 1–5)
 Jon Gabrus (season 1–5)
 Lisa Ramos (season 2–4)
 Melanie Iglesias (season 1–4)
 Pete Davidson (season 3–4)
 Tiffany Luu (season 3)
 Timothy DeLaGhetto (season 5)
 Alesha Renee (seasons 1–2)
 Julian McCullough (seasons 1–2, 4–5)
 Dan St. Germain (season 1)
 Vinny Guadagnino (seasons 1–2)
 The Kid Mero (season 5)
 Desus Nice (season 5)
 Brian Loughlin (season 1)

Guest appearances

 Kevin Hart
 Young Jeezy
 2 Chainz
 CeeLo Green
 The Game
 Mac Miller
 Pusha T
 Swizz Beatz
 Joe Budden
 Wiz Khalifa
 Nelly
 Kendrick Lamar
 Rae Sremmurd

Episodes

Series overview

Season 1 (2011–12)

Season 2 (2012)

Season 3 (2013)

Season 4 (2014)

Season 5 (2015)

Specials

See also
 Bro Code
 Fratire

References

2010s American comedy television series
2011 American television series debuts
2015 American television series endings
2010s American reality television series
English-language television shows
MTV2 original programming